Tipton Station was a Gettysburg Battlefield trolley stop of the Gettysburg Electric Railway for passenger access to Crawford's Glen to the north, Devil's Den (west), and Tipton Park (east). The station was established during the 1894 construction of the end of the trolley line and was near the Devil's Den trolley siding, south of the trolley's Warren Avenue crossing, and northeast of the Plum Run trolley bridge. An uphill trail led southwest to Big Round Top with its 1895 Observation Tower, and the "Slaughter Pen Path and Steps" were built to Devil's Den.

Tipton Park
Tipton Park was an 1894 trolley park with a tintype photographic studio and food stand on private Slaughter Pen land purchased in March 1892 by photographer William H. Tipton, an investor in the 1891 Gettysburg Electric Railway Company. As with Wheat-field Park to the west-northwest and Little Round Top Park (northeast), the park was a commemorative era visitor attraction for battlefield excursions such as the "Christian Endeavor Day" on July 25, 1899. The park property was one of the first trolley right-of-ways acquired  by the War Department after the 1896 US Supreme Court decision in the United States v. Gettysburg Electric Ry. Co. case. The trolley tracks were removed in 1917 after federal funding was authorized.

In 1934 a Gettysburg Parkitecture comfort station was built at the site and a Plum Run pedestrian bridge was built to it from Devil's Den. In 2004, artifacts associated with Tipton Park were designated as historic district contributing structures (e.g., "Tipton Boundary Marker", and the comfort station and its electrical line were removed .

References

Railway stations in the United States opened in 1894
Railway stations closed in 1917
Railway stations in Pennsylvania
Transportation buildings and structures in Adams County, Pennsylvania